Deg outfall hydro power project is located on the Upper Chenab Canal near Rachna industrial area Sheikhupura, Pujnab in Pakistan. The plant capacity is 4.04 Megawatts (MW). Its construction is funded by the Asian Development Bank.

Spillway
The project will have seven spillway units of broad crested with radial gates (Glacis Type).

Salient features
Rated Discharge = 120  m3/s
Rated Net Head = 4.0 m
Installed Capacity = 4.04 MW
Annual Energy = 27.65 GWh
Plant Factor = 78.13%
No. of Units = 2 (Horizontal shaft double regulated Kaplan turbines)
Levelized Tariff = 9.1852 (Pak Rs. / kWh)
Access to Site = On UCC via Lahore-Sheikhupura road.
Source:

Collapse of structure
In 2017, structure of project collapsed; the Punjab government established an inquiry team to investigate the incident.

Nearby landmarks
Quaid-e-Azam Business Park Sheikhupura
Rachna industrial area Shekhupura
Wapda Town Sheikhupura
Atlas Honda Power Plant
Nestle Sheikhupura

References

Dams in Pakistan
Run-of-the-river power stations
Hydroelectric power stations in Pakistan
Energy in Punjab, Pakistan